Angadimogar  is a village in Kasaragod district in the state of Kerala, India, that is located 17.5 km from the city of Kasaragod. It is rich in arecanut and coconut trees.

Demographics
As of 2011 census, Angadimogaru village had population of 4,954 where 2,397 are males and 2,557 are females. Average literacy of angadimogar village is 91.2 % lower than state average of 94 %. Male literacy is 94.9 % and Female literacy is 87.8 %.

References

See also
Perla, Kerala

Suburbs of Kasaragod